Mernua was a Nubian queen known solely from her burial at Meroe. Her burial was found intact and still contained the remains of three wooden coffins and mummy coverings in silver, including a mummy mask. also made in silver. Her name and title are only preserved on shabtis and on mummy covering found. On the mummy covering she is called king's wife. No king's name is preserved in the burial. Her royal husband can only be guessed by the style and dating of the funerary equipment. She seems to date around 600 BC. Anlamani or Aspelta are potential partners.

References 

7th-century BC women
Queens of Kush